Robert Matteson Johnston (1867–1920) was an American historian and an important scholar of military history.  He was born in Paris, Texas, and educated at Eton College and Pembroke College, Cambridge. He taught at Harvard University and Mount Holyoke College, and was a founding member of the faculty at Simmons University. In 1917, he was appointed Chief of the Historical Section of the General Staff in the field with the rank of major in the United States Army.

Scholarship
 The Roman Theocracy and the Republic, 1846–49 (1901)
 Napoleon: A Short Biography (1904)
 The Napoleonic Empire in Southern Italy and the Rise of the Secret Societies, 2 vols. (London: Macmillan, 1904). Vol. 1 Vol. 2
 The Memoirs of Malakoff (1907)
 American Soldiers (1907)
 The French Revolution (1909)
 The Corsican (1910)
 The Holy Christian Church (1912)
 Mémoire de Marie Caroline, reine de Naples (1912)
 Bull Run (1913)
 First Reflections on the Campaign of 1918 (1920)

References

External links

 
 
 

American military historians
American male non-fiction writers
Mount Holyoke College faculty
Alumni of Pembroke College, Cambridge
Harvard University faculty
1867 births
1920 deaths
People educated at Eton College
American military personnel of World War I